Madaya is a township of Aungmyethazan District in the Mandalay Region of Myanmar.

History
In the 16th century, the Gwe Shans built a stockade in the village of Okpo. On October 1, 1886, there was a reported small native garrison at Madaya and nearby Lamaing and the town was subject to invasion the same month.

Taungbyone Festival of nat (spirit) takes place in the township in August yearly.

Madaya consists Madaya town and the following villages:

Villages
Aingdaing
Dingagyun
Mayogon
Shwebaung
Sinywagale
Tainggaing
Thapandaung
Powa (North)
Mwe Pon Kan
Taking Lyon
Hein Taung

References

External links
Maplandia World Gazetteer

 
Mandalay Region